Laura Martínez (born 2 July 1964) is a Uruguayan presenter, actress, dancer and television personality. She began dancing as a child, appearing at an early age at the Teatro Colón. In 1982, she was invited by Uruguay's Teledoce to take part in a sketch. Ever since, she has featured in television programmes and is now a well-known presenter, personality and performer. She has appeared in Laura en un Maravilloso Mundo ('"Laura a Wonderful World"), a children's television program where she sings and dances with five girls. Previously married to Cacho de la Cruz, with whom she has a son, Santi. She married Marcelo Bianchi, and accountant, 5 January 2013.

Selected works 
1982 - "Telecataplum" - Teledoce
1983 - 2005 - "El Show del Mediodía" - Teledoce
1985 - 2010 - "Cacho Bochinche" - Teledoce
1989 - "Radio City Music Hall" (adult theatre with Cacho de la Cruz)
1990 - "Llegó la Tía Chichita" (theatre)
2000 - "Premio Har de Oro al mérito empresarial por su labor en la Academia de Danza "Swing"
2001 - "Adelante mi Coronel" (theatre)
2003 - "Ahora vas a ver" (CD Bochinche Cacho on its 30th anniversary)'
2007 - "Un Cuento Fantástico" (children's theatre)
2008 - "Bailando por un Reino" (children's theatre)
2009 - "Brujas" (theatre)
2010 - "Buscando a Dino" (children's theatre)
2011 - "Laura 3D" - Latinoamérica Televisión
2012 - "Lo que Ellos Quieren" (theatre)
2012 - "Laura en un Maravilloso Mundo" (children's theatre)
2012 - 2013 - "Zona Viva" - Channel 7 
2013 - "El Salvador" (theatre)
2013 - "Laura y las Chin Chin al Rescate" (children's theatre)
 2013 - "Laura en tu Casa" - Saeta TV Channel 10
 2016 - "El Francés" - (fiction TV)
2017 - 2018 - "Punta Es" - Channel 11
2017 - present - "Laura Contigo" - Channel 11 
2020 - "MasterChef Celebrity Uruguay" - (reality show, contestant) - Saeta TV Channel 10

References 

1964 births
Uruguayan female dancers
20th-century Uruguayan actresses
People from Montevideo
Living people
Uruguayan television presenters
21st-century Uruguayan actresses
Uruguayan television actresses
Uruguayan women television presenters